Sascha Palgen (born 15 August 1984 in Esch-sur-Alzette) is a Luxembourgian gymnast, who represented his nation at the Olympics for the first time in his sporting discipline since 1964. He competed at the 2008 Summer Olympics in Beijing, where he finished thirty-seventh in the men's individual all-around event. He is also a member of Etoile Rumelange, a local gymnastics club in Luxembourg, and TT Stuttgart, under his coach Manfred Diehl. Palgen named as reserve for the 2012 Summer Olympics in London by qualifying for the Olympic test event, but did not compete at the games.

Career achievements
 Finished fifth and sixth for the floor exercises at the Turnier der Meister in Cottbus, Germany, 2007 and 2008
 Thirty-seventh place in the individual all-around event at the 2008 Summer Olympics in Beijing

References

External links
 
  
 
 
 

1984 births
Living people
Luxembourgian male artistic gymnasts
Gymnasts at the 2008 Summer Olympics
Olympic gymnasts of Luxembourg
Sportspeople from Esch-sur-Alzette